Germany–Israel relations are the diplomatic relationship between the Federal Republic of Germany and the State of Israel. After the end of World War II and the Holocaust, relations gradually thawed as West Germany offered to pay reparations to Israel in 1952 and diplomatic relations were officially established in 1965. Nonetheless, a deep mistrust of the German people remained widespread in Israel and the Jewish diaspora communities worldwide for many years after. Relations between East Germany and Israel never materialised. Israel and Germany now maintain a "special relationship" based on shared beliefs, Western values, and a combination of historical perspectives. Among the most important factors in their relations is Nazi Germany's genocide of Jews in Europe during the Holocaust.

Germany is represented in Israel through its embassy in Tel Aviv and honorary consuls in Eilat and Haifa. Israel is represented in Germany through its embassy in Berlin and its Consulate-General in Munich. Both countries are full members of the Organisation for Economic Co-operation and Development and the Union for the Mediterranean.

History

Reparations agreement 

In the early 1950s, the negotiations began between the Prime Minister of Israel David Ben-Gurion, the chairman of the Jewish Claims Conference Nahum Goldmann, and the Chancellor of West Germany Konrad Adenauer. Because of the sensitivity of accepting reparations, this decision was intensely debated in the Israeli Knesset. In 1952, the Reparations Agreement was signed. All in all, as of 2007 Germany had paid 25 billion euros in reparations to the Israeli state and individual Israeli Holocaust survivors.

In 1950, Hermann Maas became the first German to be officially invited to Israel. It took another fifteen years until West Germany and Israel established diplomatic relations on May 12, 1965. Since then, mutual state visits regularly occur, although for many years relations were affected by the fact that Jews both in and outside Israel maintained a deep mistrust of Germany and the German people. German President Roman Herzog's first official visit outside Europe was to Israel in 1994. Israeli Prime Minister Ehud Barak was the first foreign leader received in Berlin after the German government's relocation from Bonn in 1999. German Chancellor Gerhard Schröder visited Israel in October 2000.
In 2005, the year of the 40th anniversary of bilateral diplomatic relations, German President Horst Köhler and Israel's former President Moshe Katsav exchanged state visits.

The two countries established a network of contacts between parliamentary, governmental, and non-governmental organizations, as well as strategic and security ties.

On January 30, 2008, Chancellor Angela Merkel's spokesman announced that the German and Israeli cabinets would meet in Israel in March 2008, in honor of Israel's 60th anniversary celebrations. This was the first time the German cabinet met with another cabinet outside of Europe. The joint meeting was expected to become an annual occurrence. On March 17, 2008, Merkel paid a three-day visit to Israel to mark Israel's 60th anniversary. Merkel and Israeli Prime Minister Ehud Olmert signed agreements on a range of projects in education, the environment and defense. Merkel spoke of her support for the Jewish state during an unprecedented speech to the Knesset on March 18, 2008.
In January 2011, Merkel visited Israel and met with Prime Minister Benjamin Netanyahu and opposition Kadima leader Tzipi Livni. In February 2011, Netanyahu called Merkel to discuss Germany's vote in the United Nations Security Council in favor of the Palestinian proposal. Merkel reportedly told Netanyahu that he had disappointed her and done nothing to advance peace. To clear the air, Netanyahu was invited for a reconciliation visit to Berlin in mid-March 2011.

In September, Merkel criticized Israel for construction in settlements in Jerusalem and said that the new housing permits raised doubts over Israel's readiness to negotiate with the Palestinians.

Germany was one of 14 countries that voted against Palestine's UNESCO membership in October 2011, within the context of the Palestine 194 initiative. When Israel announced that building settlements would continue in response to Palestinian attempts to declare statehood unilaterally, Germany threatened to stop deliveries to Israel of submarines capable of firing nuclear warheads.

Deutsche Bahn, the German national railway, in May 2011 pulled out of the high-speed railway to Jerusalem project because the line will pass in part through the West Bank. According to press reports, the German transport minister Peter Ramsauer told Deutsche Bahn's CEO that the projected rail line was "problematic from a political perspective" and violated international law. As a result, the company, which is owned by the German government, withdrew from the project. The company's decision was seen as a victory for left-wing Israeli and Palestinian activists who had waged a campaign within the context of the international Boycott, Divestment and Sanctions movement.

In May 2019, the Bundestag passed a resolution condemning BDS as antisemitism.

In March 2022, the newly elected Chancellor of Germany, Olaf Scholz, made his first official visit to Israel.

Trade

Germany is Israel's largest trading partner in Europe and Israel's second most important trading partner after the United States. Israeli imports from Germany amount to some USD 2.3 billion annually, while Israel is Germany's fourth largest trading partner in the North Africa/Middle East region.

Culture, science, and social programs 

The two countries enjoy extensive scientific relations, with cooperation in science between Israeli and German universities and the development of the Minerva Society. During the visit by President Katsav, Bundestag President Wolfgang Thierse promoted the establishment of German–Israeli Youth Office – modeled on Germany's joint youth offices with France and Poland – as a tool to educate German and Israeli youth about their respective histories and the sensitivities of their relationship.
The German-Israel Foundation for Scientific Research and Development (GIF) was established in 1986.

A number of exchange programs work between young Germans and Israelis. About 2,000 Israelis and 4,500 Germans currently participate each year in the exchange program run by Germany's Federal Ministry for the Family, Senior Citizens, Women and Youth. The German organization Action Reconciliation (Aktion Sühnezeichen) has played a role in bringing Germans and Israelis together. Since 1961, Action Reconciliation has sent about 2,500 volunteers to work in Israeli hospitals and social welfare programs. Churches and trade unions have been active in fostering relations.

Israel places great importance on sister city relationships with German cities. Haifa has five sister cities in Germany; Tel Aviv has five and Netanya has two. Over 100 Israeli cities and local authorities have ties with Germany.

According to a 2013 BBC World Service Poll, 8% of Germans view Israel's influence as positive and 67% view it as negative, though this was about average for the European countries surveyed.

In a Pew Research Center poll from 2006, Germans were asked if they sympathized more with Israel or Palestine in the Israel-Palestine conflict. 37% of Germans supported Israel against 18% who supported Palestinians. In a similar poll by Pew, conducted in 2007, 34% of the German public supported Israel, while 21% supported Palestinians. In a German poll from 2009, after the Gaza War (2008–09), 30% of the Germans held Hamas accountable for the military operation, while just 13% blamed Israel. A Pew research center poll conducted in 2013 found that 28% of Germans take Israel's side in the Israeli Palestinian conflict, while 26% take Palestinians' side. A poll conducted by German polling institute TNS Emnid in 2014 on behalf of Bertelsmann Foundation found that 15% of Germans want their government to back Israel, while only 5% want their government to back the Palestinians. When asked whom they believe the German public supports, 33% of the Germans said Israel while 9% said the Palestinians. Israelis, who were also polled in the study, were more skeptical, as only 16% of them believed the German public supports them, against 33% who believed the Germans back Palestinians.

Military cooperation
Germany and Israel have significant and long-standing military cooperation. From 1959 to 1967 the Federal Republic of Germany was a significant supplier of military equipment and arms to Israel. However, after 1965, when West Germany backed out of an agreement to sell tanks to Israel, the United States filled the order by selling 210 M48 Patton tanks. The Merkava 4 uses a German MTU MB 873 Ka-501 air-cooled diesel V12 engine produced under license. Germany has supplied Israel with Dolphin class submarines while Germany utilizes the Israeli-designed Spike Anti-Tank Missile. In 2008, it was revealed that Germany and Israel had been jointly developing a nuclear warning system, dubbed Operation Bluebird, in secret.

The German-Israeli military cooperation was shrouded in secrecy for a long period, as such an entente was not seen favorably within Israel. However, this tight relationship, translated through arms deal and intelligence sharing, developed into solid trust and ultimately laid the necessary groundwork for the establishment of diplomatic ties. For the first time in history, German combat aircraft landed at Ovda Airport in Israel to take part in the Blue Flag exercise in 2017.

See also 
 East Germany-Israel relations
International recognition of Israel
 History of the Jews in Germany
 haGalil – Online magazine for German-speaking Jews
 Anti-German sentiment in Israel

References

External links 

 Germany's Relations with Israel: Background and Implications for German Middle East Policy Congressional Research Service
  - on Israel's image in Germany
 50 years Germany-Israel relations, Frankfurter Societäts-Medien GmbH in cooperation with the German foreign ministry and the Israeli embassy in Berlin
 Germany, the Jews and Israel: an exhibition presenting 75 years of German history at the National Library of Israel's website

 
Israel
Bilateral relations of Israel